Scotcash is a not-for-profit, social enterprise and a Community Interest Company (CIC) based in Glasgow, Scotland. It provides basic bank accounts, savings accounts and affordable loans to the underbanked.

History 
Scotcash was founded in January 2007, with the help of Glasgow City Council and Glasgow Housing Association. Scotcash provides financial products and services to those who experience difficulties accessing mainstream financial services, such as banks and building societies.

The services offered by Scotcash are credit, basic bank accounts, Credit Union savings accounts, and money advice for customers.

Awards 
Scotcash was the overall winner of the Guardian Public Services Awards in 2008.

References 

Organisations based in Glasgow
Organizations established in 2007